Pelophryne signata is a species of toad in the family Bufonidae.
It is found in Brunei, Malaysia, and possibly Indonesia.
Its natural habitats are subtropical or tropical moist lowland forests and freshwater marshes.
It is threatened by habitat loss.

References

Pelophryne
Amphibians described in 1894
Taxonomy articles created by Polbot